John R. Smith may refer to:

 John R. Smith (agriculture commissioner) (19th century), American politician from North Carolina
 John R. Smith (politician, born 1945), politician from Leesville, Louisiana
 John Raphael Smith (1751–1812), English painter
 John Robert Smith (21st century), American politician from Mississippi
 John Roxburgh Smith (1939–2018), Canadian politician in the Legislative Assembly of Ontario
 John Rubens Smith (1775–1849), American painter
 John Russell Smith (1810–1894), English bookseller and bibliographer
 John Richard Smith (footballer, born 1898) (1898–1986), English footballer
 John Smith (footballer, born 1971) (John Richard Smith), English footballer